National Highway 83 (NH 83)  was a former National Highway in India entirely within the state of Bihar. NH 83 linked state capital, Patna (of Bihar) to Dobhi on former National Highway 2 (new NH 19) and passed through Jehanabad, Gaya and Bodhgaya.
 After renumbering of national highways, new National Highway 83 is now located in the state of Tamil Nadu.

See also 
 National Highway
 List of National Highways
 National Highways Development Project

References

External links
  Route map of NH 83

83
National highways in India (old numbering)